Hottonia inflata, the American featherfoil or featherfoil, is an aquatic plant in the family Primulaceae.

Distribution

Featherfoil occurs sporadically in the eastern United States, from Texas to Maine, in the coastal plains along the Atlantic and Gulf of Mexico.

Description

This aquatic wildflower has basal fibrous roots buried in the underlying mud, while thin, feather-like roots float freely in the water. The leaves are somewhat variable and can be submergent or floating. The leaves can be linear or filiform and arranged alternately, oppositely or whorled, with a pinnate or bipinnate division. Its flowers are small and white or violet in color and are located at the end of thickly inflated flower stalks.

Habitat
Featherfoil lives in swamps, ditches, and shallow ponds, including beaver ponds, with relatively stable water levels.

References

Primulaceae
Aquatic plants
Flora of the Northeastern United States
Flora of the North-Central United States
Flora of the Southeastern United States
Flora of Texas